Ectopatria neuroides is a moth of the family Noctuidae. It is found in New South Wales, the Northern Territory, Queensland, South Australia and Western Australia.

External links
Australian Faunal Directory

Moths of Australia
Noctuinae
Moths described in 1901